The Church of Jesus Christ of Latter-day Saints in Chile refers to the Church of Jesus Christ of Latter-day Saints (LDS Church) and its members in Chile. The first small branch was established in 1956. Since then, the LDS Church in Chile has grown to more than 600,000 members in 568 congregations. Chile ranks as having the 3rd most members of the LDS Church in South America and the 6th worldwide. The LDS Church in Chile has more members per capita than the United States and is the second largest denomination in Chile behind the Roman Catholic Church. Chile has more LDS Church members per capita than any country outside of the Pacific Islands.

History

The LDS Church has been established in Chile for over sixty years. The church experienced some periods of rapid expansion during that time, becoming, by some estimates, the second largest church in the country.

Early apostle Parley P. Pratt was among the first Mormon missionaries to preach in Chile, landing in Valparaiso in November, 1851, along with Elder Rufus Allen and Phoebe Sopher, one of Pratt's wives, who was pregnant at the time. The mission party was impressed by the Chilean countryside and people. Pratt wrote that the people he met in Chile were "a neat, plain, loving and sociable people; very friendly, frank, and easy to become acquainted with," but the mission trip met with tragedy when the Pratt's month-old son died in January 1852. Hampered by language difficulties and a lack of literature in the Spanish language (selections of the Book of Mormon were not translated into Spanish until 1875) the missionaries left Chile after four months without having a successful baptism. Pratt used his experience in South America to advise Brigham Young that the success of future missionary efforts would be based on translations of the Mormon scriptures. Another difficulty was that, at the time of Pratt's visit, the Chilean constitution did not permit the public practice of any religion besides Catholicism.

Missionary work in Chile began in earnest in 1956, when the country was made part of the Argentine mission and the first small branch was formed. By 1961, the country had 1,100 members and the Chilean mission was organized. The following three decades saw explosive growth in church membership, with the church membership doubling every two years at its peak. The growth sparked a building boom during these decades. Hundreds of LDS meetinghouses were constructed, capped by the dedication of the Santiago Temple in 1983. Church growth continued in the 1990s, with the country having the greatest growth in LDS membership in South America during the decade. Between 1994 and 1996, 26 new stakes were dedicated in the country.

The period of rapid expansion in membership was followed by a sharp contraction. The church is now retrenching after its period of high growth and hundreds of units have been decommissioned since 1998. In 2002, the church sent Elder Jeffrey R. Holland, a member of the Quorum of the Twelve Apostles, to remain in Chile for a year to train leadership and minister to the church, a role typically held by members of the quorums of the seventy. Due to high levels of member inactivity, 37% of the stakes created in Chile have since been discontinued.

Although an average of 12,000 people were baptized annually between 1961 and 1990, membership growth has now cooled and the church has a large number of inactive members. According to census data, 0.9% of the population claims to be Mormon, based upon those aged 15 and over who identify themselves as Mormon. The church itself reports that it has 595,526 members in Chile, which is equal to about 3.3% of the population. If accurate, these numbers makes the LDS Church the single largest denomination in Chile after Catholicism. LDS statistics counts everyone baptized, including children age eight or older as well as inactive members. Using unofficial sources, the Cumorah Project website estimates that 20% of Chilean members actively attend church services.

Jorge F. Zeballos, a former civil engineer, is a Chilean-born LDS general authority. He was called to the First Quorum of the Seventy in April, 2008. Zeballos is the second Chilean to serve as a general authority. He followed Eduardo Ayala, who served in the Second Quorum of the Seventy from 1990 to 1995.

A second temple, in Concepción, was announced in 2009. The groundbreaking for this temple occurred on October 17, 2015, and it was later dedicated on October 28, 2018.

In April 2019, church president Russell M. Nelson announced a third Chilean temple to be built in Antofagasta.

Church schools in Chile
When the Chilean Mission was organized in 1961, A. Delbert Palmer was its mission president. Church leaders considered communism to be an "evil force" and area authority Theodore Tuttle encouraged Palmer to create a school to protect students from communism. Local members requested schooling for their children, especially after some were expelled from Catholic schools for joining the LDS Church. In 1963, Tuttle and Palmer started preparing two elementary schools in La Cisterna and Vina del Mar. They reported directly to the first presidency rather than to the CES board of education. Dale Harding's position as superintendent was both a professional and religious position. The schools opened in March 1964.

In the 1960s in Chile, educational reforms gave children more opportunities for education, but there still existed a large divide between public and private schools, both of which were supported by the government. Because of the educational situation, parents were very interested in private LDS schools for their children. After the first year, all the children passed their government-administered end-of-year exams, with many performing very well. A large earthquake in March 1965 greatly damaged both schools, but the schools continued despite this setback. Rather than use the traditional lecture-exam format, teachers varied their teaching methods to include group work and in-service training. In 1967, Lyle J. Loosle became the new superintendent. Under his leadership, volunteers supported new elementary schools in Nunoa and Talcahuano.

In 1970, the Church Board of Education approved the purchase of a Catholic school near Santiago. Later that year, Salvador Allende, a Marxist, was elected as president, and Church members were uncertain about the future of the LDS Church and Church schools. Middle-class citizens of various kinds opposed a National Unified School system. The minister of education requested using a church building for another session of schooling. In response, Loosle increased enrollment to ensure that the schools were always operating at full capacity. Kindergartens operated in LDS chapels in Arica, Inquique, and La Calera to keep them from being used by the government for other purposes. After Allende was overthrown, the kindergartens closed.

Seminary teacher Richard Brimhall visited the schools in 1972 and felt alarmed at how many faculty were Marxists. That year, Jorge Rojas, from Mexico, became the next superintendent. He felt that the Church schools ought to be closed because of their Marxist leanings, and made this recommendation to Church officials. After Rojas dismissed two non-member teachers, other teachers formed a union to protest new policies. Loosle was asked to return after Church headquarters reassigned Rojas to a school in Mexico. Loosle dismissed teacher's union leaders when they refused to resign. The union leaders demanded reinstatement. Loosle asked teachers to repent of their unionization; some union members left the school, while others left the union. Loosle rehired some of the union leaders. In 1973, Beningno Pantoja Arratia became the new superintendent, and he instituted several reforms, including ecclesiastical interviews. In 1970, Neal A. Maxwell became the Church Commissioner of Education, a new position overseeing Church schools, seminaries, and institutes. A 1971 policy from Maxwell stated that non-religious education should only be provided by the Church when "other educational systems are nonexistent, seriously deficient or inaccessible to our members." Chilean church schools started to close in 1977, with the Church's growth and adequate public schools given as reasons for closure. By 1981, Church schools had completely closed in Chile, Peru, Bolivia, and Paraguay.

Missions

Temples

See also

Religion in Chile

Notes

References
Néstor Curbelo, "Conversion and Change in Chile", Liahona, October 2014

External links
 LDS Newsroom - Chile
 The Church of Jesus Christ of Latter-day Saints (Chile) - Official Site
 The Church of Jesus Christ of Latter-day Saints - Visitors Site

External links
 The Church of Jesus Christ of Latter-day Saints Official site
 Church News "Country information: Chile" 
 LDS Newsroom (Chile)